Cratosilis laeta is a species of soldier beetle belonging to the family Cantharidae.

Description
These small insects have a black head and a reddish pronotum, while elytrae are brownish with black bands.

Distribution
This species can be found in Italy and Switzerland.

References

External links
 Linnea.it
 Natura Mediterraneo

Beetles of Europe
Cantharidae
Beetles described in 1792